Charles Roslyn Carney (August 25, 1900 – September 5, 1984) was an American football and basketball player.

Carney was born in Chicago in 1900.  He enrolled at the University of Illinois where he excelled in both football and basketball.  He played at the end position for the Fighting Illini football team from 1918 to 1921. He was selected as a consensus first-team All-American in 1920. He was elected to the College Football Hall of Fame in 1966.

Carney was a member of the Illini men's basketball team from 1920 to 1922. He established the single-season, Big Ten Conference record with 60 field goals (188 points) during the 1921 Big Ten season, a record that stood for 22 years.   He was selected as an All-American basketball player in both 1920 and 1922, becoming the first Big Ten athlete to receive All-American honors in both football and basketball. He was named Helms Foundation College Basketball Player of the Year in 1922.

He is the only Fighting Illini athlete to earn consensus All-America honors in both football and basketball. He is a member of the Helms Foundation College Basketball Hall of Fame as well as the IBCA Hall of Fame. A three-time first-team all-conference selection as a basketball player, Carney is also a member of Illinois All-Century Teams for both football and basketball. 

After completing his studies at the University of Illinois, Carney played one season in the APFA for the Columbus Panhandles, starting only one game. He followed his playing years by serving as an assistant football coach for several years. He held posts as the ends coach for the Northwestern Wildcats, Wisconsin Badgers, and Harvard Crimson. He later worked as a New York Stock Exchange representative for the investment banking and financial services firm of Dominick & Dominick.

Honors

Basketball
 1922 – Helms National Player of the Year

 1920, 1922 – First Team All-American

 1920, 1921, 1922 – First-team All-Big Ten

 1975 – Inducted into the Illinois Basketball Coaches Association's Hall of Fame as a player.

 2004 – Elected to the "Illini Men's Basketball All-Century Team".

 September 13, 2008 – Honored as one of the thirty-three honored jerseys which hang in the State Farm Center to show regard for being the most decorated basketball players in the University of Illinois' history.

September 22, 2018 – Inducted into the Illinois Athletics Hall of Fame

Football
 1920 – First Team All-American

 [ 1966] – College Football Hall of Fame

 November 2, 1990 – Elected to Illinois Football All-Century Team

Statistics

Basketball

Football

References

External links

 
 
 

1900 births
1984 deaths
All-American college football players
All-American college men's basketball players
American football ends
Basketball players from Chicago
College Football Hall of Fame inductees
Forwards (basketball)
Harvard Crimson football coaches
Illinois Fighting Illini football players
Illinois Fighting Illini men's basketball players
Northwestern Wildcats football coaches
Players of American football from Chicago
Sportspeople from Chicago
Wisconsin Badgers football coaches
American men's basketball players
Psi Upsilon